Aroga atraphaxi is a moth of the family Gelechiidae. It is found in Tajikistan.

The wingspan is 14.5–15.5 mm. The forewings are covered with light-grey scales with a brown tip on a light-grey ground colour. The costal margin has two small and two large triangular spots, two small basal spots in the middle and near the posterior margin, as well as two merged or closely placed dark spots in the middle of the cell and one small spot in the corner of the cell. The apex is dark, sometimes with terminal spots. The hindwings are grey.

The larvae feed on Atraphaxis pyrifolia.

Etymology
The species is named for the host plant.

References

Moths described in 2009
Aroga
Moths of Asia